Uropappus, commonly called silverpuffs, is a genus of North American plants in the tribe Cichorieae within the family Asteraceae. Some authors accept only one species, U. lindleyi, and separate Stebbinsoseris.

 Species
 Uropappus kellogii Greene - CA AZ, Baja California
 Uropappus lindleyi (DC.) Nutt. - Canada (BC), United States (WA OR CA NV ID UT AZ NM TX SC)
 Uropappus pruinosus Greene - NM

 formerly included
 Uropappus clevelandii - Microseris heterocarpa 
 Uropappus heterocarpus  - Microseris heterocarpa
 Uropappus kelloggii  - Microseris heterocarpa 
 Uropappus leucocarpus  - Microseris heterocarpa

References

External links
 
  Calflora Database: Uropappus lindleyi  (Silver puffs)
  CalPhotos gallery of Uropappus lindleyi  (Silver puffs) images — University of California, Berkeley.

Cichorieae
Asteraceae genera
Flora of Northwestern Mexico
Flora of the Northwestern United States
Flora of the Southwestern United States
Flora of the South-Central United States
Flora of British Columbia
Flora of California
Taxa named by Thomas Nuttall